Joanne is the fifth studio album by American singer Lady Gaga. It was released on October 21, 2016, by Streamline and Interscope Records. Gaga, Mark Ronson and BloodPop handled its production aside variety other collaborators, such as Kevin Parker, Emile Haynie, Jeff Bhasker and Josh Homme. Musically, Joanne is a stripped-down, dance-pop, soft rock and Americana record with country elements, aimed to focus on Gaga's vocals. Lyrically, the album delves into the theme of family and life's emotions; the death of her aunt, Joanne Stefani Germanotta, deeply influenced the record. The singer's experience acting on the television series American Horror Story also influenced its creative process.

Joanne became Gaga's fourth consecutive album to debut atop on the US Billboard 200 and reached the top ten in over 25 countries, earning certifications in some of them. To promote it, three singles were released: "Perfect Illusion", "Million Reasons" and the title track. "Perfect Illusion" was released as the album's lead single on September 9, 2016, and reached number one in France, while "Million Reasons" reached number four in the United States. A piano version of the title track was released to radio in selected territories as the album's third single. The album received generally favorable reviews from critics, who praised Gaga's musical direction, vocals, production and lyrical content, but had ambivalent reactions for its lack of cohesiveness. Joanne was nominated for Best Pop Vocal Album at the 60th Annual Grammy Awards. "Million Reasons" and "Joanne" were nominated — in different years — for Best Pop Solo Performance, for which the latter won the award.

The release and promotion of the album marked a softening of Gaga's image, who took on a more singer-songwriter-oriented look, consisting mainly of a pink, wide-brimmed cowgirl hat, vintage denim and pastel colors, evoking the 1970s. She promoted the album with her Dive Bar Tour, a promotional concert in dive bars in the United States, and the Joanne World Tour, which began in August 2017 and ended in February 2018. Gaga also did some television appearances, while headlined the Super Bowl LI halftime show and the 2017 Coachella Festival. In that year, she released a documentary film, titled Gaga: Five Foot Two, showing the production of the album and her halftime performance.

Background and development
Lady Gaga's third studio album Artpop was released in November 2013 to mixed reviews. It debuted atop the Billboard 200 chart, and had sold 2.5 million copies as of July 2014. Gaga split from her longtime manager Troy Carter in late 2013. By June 2014, she and new manager Bobby Campbell had joined Artist Nation, the artist management division of Live Nation Entertainment. Gaga confessed to NME that she had considered quitting music altogether when feeling depressed about herself and "wasn't able to see my own ability or my own talent". The ambivalent reception to Artpop, all the controversies around this album and Born This Way (2011), and the negative press reactions, led Gaga's management to come up with an image change for her. Along with a more subdued appearance in the media, Gaga emphasized her vocal prowess. A tribute to the 50th anniversary of The Sound of Music at the 87th Academy Awards, where she sang a medley of songs from the film, was critically lauded. She and Tony Bennett also released Cheek to Cheek, an album of jazz duets, in September 2014 to generally favorable reviews. It debuted atop the Billboard 200, becoming Gaga's third consecutive number-one album in the United States, and won a Grammy Award for Best Traditional Pop Vocal Album.

Gaga also starred in American Horror Story: Hotel (2015–2016), the fifth season of the American anthology television series American Horror Story, winning a Golden Globe Award for Best Actress – Miniseries or Television Film. At the awards ceremony, the singer confirmed she would be releasing her fifth studio album later in 2016, and was working on the logistics and aspects including the look she would portray for the record. Throughout most of 2015 and 2016, Gaga teased fans about the album's creative and recording processes on her social media accounts. She was seen collaborating with longtime producer RedOne, as well as new collaborators like Giorgio Moroder, Mark Ronson and Nile Rodgers.

Writing and recording

According to Gaga, she wanted "fans to be surprised [by the album] ... it's a wonderful, soul-searching experience. And it's very unlike [Artpop] in that way". In an interview with Billboard, producer RedOne said the singer was mentally in a "cleaner" state of mind, hearkening back to her earlier days, which he felt was beneficial. Gaga and Ronson served as Joannes executive producers. The two grew up within blocks of each another in New York's Upper East Side, and had collaborated on Wale's song "Chillin" (2009). They reunited in late 2015, when Gaga presented the song "Angel Down" to Ronson at a studio in London. Later, the duo worked for six months in Rick Rubin's Shangri-La recording studio in Malibu, while he was between projects. On Gaga and Ronson's first day at Shangri-La, they wrote the song "Joanne". Ronson encouraged Gaga to write lyrics about "whatever was happening in her life or on her mind".

Recording continued until the album's final mastering session. Gaga was deeply involved with the technicalities of the music being recorded. "She loves just sitting at a piano and barking orders at a drummer and she has an incredible voice", Ronson said, adding that they began with the music and then proceeded with the songs. He later said that the music recorded with Gaga was "some of my favorite music I've really ever worked on. It's incredible – I love it. I can't wait until you can hear it because the music speaks for itself". Ronson also hinted at the involvement of Kevin Parker, frontman for the Australian psychedelic rock band Tame Impala, which BBC Music later confirmed to be true.

Many prominent musicians make guest appearances on Joanne. Gaga invited Father John Misty to play drums on the record. Ronson invited Josh Homme to play guitar on the song "John Wayne" because of his work for the band Queens of the Stone Age; in addition, Homme drummed and was a co-producer. Ronson also invited Beck to collaborate on the album, resulting in the song "Dancin' in Circles". Gaga, a longtime fan of Beck's, was initially starstruck at working with him. Gaga and Florence Welch developed the concept of their duet, "Hey Girl", during a meeting at New York's Electric Lady Studios. According to Gaga, the song's theme demanded a female collaborator. She selected Welch, calling her "if not the best, one of the greatest vocalists in the world".

Ronson crafted the album's organic sound by recruiting musicians he had previously worked with on projects for Rufus Wainwright and Amy Winehouse. He credited producer BloodPop with "[bringing the album] into the modern era". In the meantime, Gaga collaborated with Elton John; their sessions resulted in a song titled "Room in My Heart", that did not make the album's final cut. In 2017, Gaga released her documentary film Gaga: Five Foot Two on Netflix, which included scenes of the singer and Ronson shot during the album's recording sessions.

Themes and influences

Family is an underlying theme on Joanne. Gaga explained the album "goes through all of [life]'s emotions". While crafting it, she envisioned a girl in the middle of the country, who would understand the singer's lyrics and find a human connection. To achieve that, Gaga said in an interview with E! she decided to encompass an assortment of genres, including "[crossing] between country and funk, pop, dance, rock, electronic music, folk". The tragic early demise of Joanne Germanotta added to the emotional quotient of the songs, as well as to their lyrics. Along with identity, feelings such as loss, heartbreak, frustration, desire and nostalgia also influenced the album. The singer clarified that with Joanne she wanted to go "out into the world ... bringing with me its deepest stories that I have of my life and turning them into songs that I hope will touch people in a deep and meaningful way about their own lives and their own stories."

The singer's experience working on American Horror Story influenced Joannes creative process. Gaga mentioned: "I have returned to something I've believed in so much, which is the art of darkness." Being on the show also impacted her vocals. She explained that she would "listen" more to the music and then write. She added that Joanne would talk less about her painful time during the Artpop era and would have more clarity; "Now I'm thinking more about what it is I want to say and what I want to leave on Earth. It's less an expression of all my pain", she concluded. The album became an outlet for the singer to relieve herself of the "pain and anguish" she felt from the constant expectations people had of her music.

Other influences came from the men in Gaga's life, from her father Joe Germanotta and ex-fiancé Taylor Kinney. She said that using her "rebellious spirit" she wanted to understand the different relationships she had gone through, saying that Joanne was not a "sad album. It's an album that is very revealing of me as a woman". According to Kevin Fallon of The Daily Beast, "The act of being Lady Gaga had drowned out the brilliant music, and the importance of Lady Gaga had somehow muddied the simple pleasure of being her fan: It was her authenticity, in all of its strangeness and lofty artistic pursuit, that spoke to us. That seemed to have gone missing." He felt that with Joanne, Gaga was able to eliminate that redundancy and present herself as an "evolved performer", who could lay down bare emotions in the songs, rather than "mask" them in electronic music beats.

Title and packaging

Gaga named the album after Joanne Stefani Germanotta, her father's sister. She died on December 18, 1974, at age 19 due to complications arising from lupus. Gaga, whose middle name is Joanne (Stefani Joanne Angelina Germanotta), recognized her aunt's death had a profound effect on her family and her work. The booklet in her debut album, The Fame (2008), contained a poem titled For a Moment written by Joanne.

Gaga credits Joanne with helping her overcome addiction problems, and dedicated The Fame Ball Tour (2009) to her. The singer tattooed the date of Joanne's death on her left biceps, between lines of a verse from a poem by Rainer Maria Rilke. The singer's parents opened a restaurant called Joanne Trattoria in New York in 2012. Gaga has often said that although she never met her, Joanne was "one of the most important figures in my life". After she wrote the song "Joanne" with Ronson, they decided to use the name as the album's title as a tribute to her aunt.

Along with revealing the album's title, Gaga also unveiled the cover artwork. It consists of an image of the singer's left profile, with her wearing a pink, wide-brimmed hat, against a blue background. The hat was designed by milliner Gladys Tamez who revealed it was another source of inspiration behind the overall direction of Joanne. The milliner explained to The Daily Beast that one of the hats was inspired by English singer Marianne Faithfull. She added, "Gaga was the first to ever request this hat in pink, because it's her favorite color". Tamez named it "Lady Joanne" and added that Gaga had her change the shape, color and the ribbon on the hat. While designing the cover and the overall image, Tamez and Gaga spoke of using more pastel colors, inspired by the 1970s.

Dominique Redfearn of Billboard noted that the cover appeared simpler compared to those for Born This Way (2011) and Artpop (2013). Billboards Andrew Unterberger described it as "thoughtfully composed", adding it was an indication that the album's music was much more straightforward than her earlier work. The standard version of the album contains 11 songs; the deluxe edition includes three additional tracks—two bonus songs and a demo. The booklet includes Gaga and her father's pictures, Joanne's driving license as well as her handwriting. Gaga felt it was "nice to include family heirlooms that carry meaning to me still today ... And a Polaroid of me and [Ronson] in the studio".

Music and lyrics
Journalists have described Joanne as a dance-pop, soft rock, and Americana album, with elements of country music. According to Rolling Stone, Gaga "didn't give much thought to genre" while creating Joanne, which ranges from the dance-rock of its lead single, "Perfect Illusion", to the introspective country songwriting of the title track, "Joanne". Gaga stated she professed a fascination with all aspects of country music, which in turn influenced the album. In terms of production and composition, Joanne continued the "stripped-down" approach to music Gaga had taken following Artpop, emphasizing her vocals and the songwriting. Gaga told Rolling Stone that the tracks consisted of "stories about my family, my sister, my father and his sister. My mom's family. My relationships with men, my failures".

Songs

Joe Lynch of Billboard described Joanne as "a stylistically eclectic collection of swaggering rock, introspective ballads and soulful, danceable grooves". It opens with the track "Diamond Heart" which sets the album's tone. Hearkening back to her earlier works, this autobiographical song talks about Gaga's time as a go-go dancer in New York. "Diamond Heart" varies from a moody vibe in the verses, to a drum-oriented pre-chorus, and finally a rock-EDM chorus, with Homme playing guitar. The second track, "A-Yo", has touches of country, and is reminiscent of the music played in dive bars, with double hand claps and brass-accentuated beats. Lyrically, it is a metaphor for having sex. The repetition of the same two chords in the song's instrumentation is complemented by BloodPop's background shouts and synth elements. As the title track starts, the general tempo drops. Accompanied by just an acoustic guitar and minimal percussion, Gaga sings "heartfelt" lyrics about her late aunt Joanne. The singer described the track as "the true heart and soul of the record".

The electronic "John Wayne" is more tongue-in-cheek lyrically, with Gaga including cowboy references in the lyrics: "I just love a cowboy, I know it's bad, but I'm, like, can I just hang off the back of your horse and can you go a little faster?". Gaga's vocals are accompanied by Homme's guitar, and the track alludes to her previous relationships, with comparisons to actor John Wayne. The Beck-composed track "Dancin' in Circles" is a pop song, consisting of a dance beat, a spoken-word bridge, and lyrics about having a good time by oneself. It was described by Nicholas Mojica of the International Business Times as an "ode to masturbation". It has influences of reggae and ska, hearkening back to Gaga's own "Alejandro" (2010), as well as the music of Gwen Stefani. The lyrics find Gaga, dancing alone late at night, fantasizing about a past lover and masturbating: "I lay around, touch myself to pass the time / I feel down, I wish you were mine".

According to Mark Savage of BBC Music, "Perfect Illusion" is a disco-rock song, composed around a building chord sequence, which he felt leads to a "compelling sense of urgency". The singer's vocals are kept raw and "untreated", eschewing Auto-Tune. The composition consists of "pulsing verses" and a guitar-and-vocal breakdown before the final chorus, where Gaga sings the title multiple times. Around the two-minute mark, there is a key change for the final chorus. In "Million Reasons" Gaga talks about love which does not last, uttering several variations of the title in the verses. The composition consists of a simple, country-oriented piano and guitar instrumentation. In the chorus Gaga sings, "You're giving me a million reasons to let you go / You're giving me a million reasons to quit the show". Tom Rasmussen of Vice feels "Million Reasons" has the strongest country music influence of all the songs on Joanne.

"Sinner's Prayer" consists of instrumentation from bells and whistles, and is a mixture of country music, R&B and pop. The Father John Misty-assisted track finds a vulnerable Gaga wanting her man to love her true self. The lyric, "Her love for him ain't cheap / But it breaks just like a knockoff piece from Fulton Street" references the said street in Manhattan, New York, where cheap trinkets are available. For the ninth track "Come to Mama", Gaga sings in an affected voice, elongating her vowel enunciation. The 1970s-inspired composition has a big chorus, highlighted by a brass section and an upbeat drum rhythm, and talks about accepting one another. The song has biblical references, with Gaga alluding to both the Old and New Testaments. The lyric about "a forty-day flood" references Noah's ark while "stop throwin' stones at your sisters and your brothers" is taken from one of Jesus' aphorisms, "Let any one of you who is without sin be the first to throw a stone at her."

In "Hey Girl", BloodPop and Ronson added a downtempo funk production to accompany Gaga and Welch's prominent vocals. The lyrics are an "ode to friendship". The eleventh track, "Angel Down", was inspired by the death of Trayvon Martin, who was shot dead by George Zimmerman in 2012. Gaga sings lyrics like "Shots were fired on the street, by the church where we used to meet" in this torch song. Deluxe edition bonus track "Grigio Girls" was written for Sonja Durham, creative coordinator of her team, the Haus of Gaga, who had breast cancer. The song's lyrics include, "I was 23 / She was 35 / I was spiralin' out / And she was so alive". The second bonus track, "Just Another Day" was inspired by glam and the work of David Bowie.

Release
Gaga's manager Bobby Campbell confirmed the album would not be released until the latter half of 2016; Elton John said it would not be released until 2017. In September 2016, Gaga updated her official website announcing the new album and revealed the title of the lead single, "Perfect Illusion". On September 15, the singer appeared on Apple Radio's Beats 1 and announced the album was titled Joanne and its release date would be October 21, 2016. She also confirmed that within the next 48 hours, the recording would be finished. Gaga confessed that finally announcing the album's name and release date was a bittersweet moment for her, acknowledging "this isn't the end just the end of this moment. It's also the beginning of this moment."

During the same interview, the singer confirmed that, unlike recent releases, the album would not be available exclusively on streaming services like Apple Music or Tidal. "I told my label that if they signed those contracts with Apple Music and Tidal, I'd leak all my own new music," she explained to host Zane Lowe. Gaga's was opposed to these services having exclusive streaming rights to an artist's releases. Before its release, the album was leaked several times. On Amazon, the album was listed for pre-order and the songs were to be made available as and when they were released. However, on Amazon's Echo speaker, fans found that if they instructed it to "play Joanne by Lady Gaga", it previewed 30-second snippets of each track. Amazon later disabled previews for the whole album. Three days prior to the official release date of October 21, the album was mistakenly put out for sale in shops in Belgium. This allowed people to post it on the Internet, leading to leaks of songs.

Promotion
Chris Willman of Billboard wrote that the promotional "blitz" for Joanne "felt like something from a bygone era" due to the traditional route taken by Gaga and her team, in place of surprise album launches. During her interview on The Howard Stern Show Gaga confirmed that she wanted to promote Joanne in the "old-school style". The events leading up to the release were described by Willman as "the most culturally ubiquitous rollout since Taylor Swift's 1989 two years ago". He theorized that after the perceived commercial disappointment with Artpop, Gaga's management wanted to make sure of a comeback with Joanne. Adding to this was the musical and stylistic change that Gaga underwent with the release, which would have confused her core audience and fans without promotion. Willman concluded that the promo would "provide a pre-Super Bowl primer to Middle America — that somewhere between the meat dress and the Tony Bennett collaboration, Gaga has settled into a middle path".

Singles

"Perfect Illusion" was released as the album's first single on September 9, 2016. It received mixed to positive reviews from music critics, many of whom complimented its catchiness, the song's key change and Gaga's vocal delivery. Others deemed it a disappointing choice as a lead single compared to the singer's previous releases. The song debuted at number one in France while reaching a peak of number 15 on the Billboard Hot 100.

This was followed by the release of two promotional singles—"Million Reasons" on October 6 and "A-Yo" on October 18, 2016. "A-Yo" was initially chosen as the second single of the album, but "Million Reasons" proved to be more successful commercially and was released as a single first. The song debuted at number 76 on the Billboard Hot 100, initially peaking at number 54. However, after Gaga's Super Bowl performance, it re-entered the chart at number four, becoming her fourteenth top-ten in the nation. The placement was aided by the song reaching number one on the Digital Songs Chart with sales of 149,000 copies, 7.6 million US streams and 15 million radio airplays. Most critics reacted positively to the song, highlighting its simple nature and the lyrics. It was certified Platinum by the Recording Industry Association of America (RIAA). For further promotion, both singles were accompanied by music videos, with the clip for "Million Reasons" being a continuation of "Perfect Illusion". The loose narrative contained in the two clips was continued later in a video for "John Wayne".

"Joanne" was released as the third single from the album in Italy on December 22, 2017, and a piano version of the song as well as its music video (dedicated to her deceased aunt Joanne) was released as a digital download worldwide on January 26, 2018.

Performances
Promotional activities for Joanne began with the announcement of "Perfect Illusion" as the album's lead single. Gaga performed it live for the first time at Moth Club in London, on September 10, 2016. She featured "Perfect Illusion" in a trailer for American Horror Story: Roanoke (2016), adding to the anonymous nature around the season's theme. Gaga released a number of commercials for Apple Music featuring the track. She gave interviews to Good Morning America and The New York Times, and appeared at Manhattan's Best Buy shop to purchase Joanne for unsuspecting customers.

The singer performed "A-Yo" and "Million Reasons" on Saturday Night Live on October 22, 2016, assisted by Ronson and Lindsey. On October 25, 2016, Gaga appeared on The Late Late Show with James Corden in the Carpool Karaoke segment singing her previous singles, along with "Perfect Illusion" and "Million Reasons". Later she sang "A-Yo" on the main stage of The Late Late Show. The following week Gaga headed to Japan to promote Joanne. She performed a piano version of "Perfect Illusion" on Sukkiri, "Joanne" on News Zero and a medley of "Million Reasons", "Perfect Illusion" and "A-Yo" on SMAP×SMAP. Gaga sang "Million Reasons" at the 2016 American Music Awards and the Ali Forney Center, an LGBT pride center. Album tracks "Come to Mama" and "Angel Down" were performed at presidential candidate Hillary Clinton's final campaign stop in Raleigh, North Carolina.

Gaga traveled to Paris where she performed "Million Reasons", "A-Yo" and "John Wayne" at the 2016 Victoria's Secret Fashion Show. In the United Kingdom, Gaga began her promotion of Joanne with a surprise gig at London's Shepherd's Bush Westfield shopping center. She later performed "Million Reasons" on the semi-final of the 13th season of The X Factor, and at the 2016 Royal Variety Performance, attended by Charles, Prince of Wales and Camilla, Duchess of Cornwall, as well as on Alan Carr's Happy Hour.

Gaga was the headliner of the Super Bowl LI halftime show, where along with past material, she performed "Million Reasons" on the piano. She was also a main headliner at the 2017 Coachella Festival. Her setlist included "John Wayne", "A-Yo", and "Million Reasons" from the album. In 2018, Gaga performed "Joanne" and "Million Reasons" on the piano at the 60th Annual Grammy Awards, where she was joined on stage by Mark Ronson, who played guitar.

Tour

Shortly before the release of the album, Gaga announced her Dive Bar Tour, sponsored by Bud Light. The 3-date long concert series saw her visit dive bars in the United States on October 5, 20 and 27, 2016. Her performances were live streamed on Bud Light's Facebook page. As Gaga had her first live performances in dive bars she felt she had the opportunity to return to her roots with these concerts, and she also aimed to make a closer connection with her audience after her stadium and arena shows. She added the venues would accentuate the "raw Americana vibe" of the album.

On February 5, 2017, Gaga announced she would embark on the Joanne World Tour to support the album. It began on August 1, 2017, and ended on February 1, 2018. Gaga postponed the European leg of the tour due to severe pain caused by fibromyalgia and was forced to cancel the last 10 shows. The concert was deemed "more minimalist" compared to the singer's previous tours, but received praise for its visuals, Gaga's singing abilities and her connection with the audience. The tour ultimately grossed $95 million from sales of 842,000 tickets.

Critical reception

 AnyDecentMusic? summed up the critical consensus as 6.6 out of 10. British music journalist Neil McCormick gave the album a four-out-of-five-star rating in his review published in The Daily Telegraph and complimented the old-fashioned songs on the album. Stephen Thomas Erlewine of AllMusic gave it a three-and-a-half-out-of-five rating. In a positive review he wrote that unlike Gaga's previous endeavors where she appeared as a "high-wire act", Joanne was more "earth-bound" and is a "record made by an artist determined to execute only the stunts she knows how to pull off ... Gaga's feet remain firmly planted in dance-pop even when she brings in a number of collaborators". The same rating was given by Rolling Stones Rob Sheffield, who described the release as an "old-school Nineties soft rock album, heavy on the acoustic guitar". He complimented the understated production by Ronson and the other producers.

Writing for The A.V. Club, Annie Zaleski commended the "genre fluidity" of Joanne. Rating it a "B", Zaleski noted that songs like "Diamond Heart", "John Wayne", "Sinner's Prayer" and "Hey Girl" are the album's best tracks and highlighted Gaga's vocal prowess. In a three-out-of-five-star review for Slant Magazine, Sal Cinquemani criticized the album for its oversung ballads and lack of strong hooks but deemed it more consistent and focused than Artpop. Maeve McDermott of USA Today complimented Gaga for "expanding her artistic vision and toying with different genres [on the album], while still recording the customary pop tracks listeners have come to expect". Andy Gill gave the album three out of five stars in a review for The Independent. Gill commended the album's rock-leaning tracks, and Homme's work on "A-Yo" and "John Wayne" as highlights, but called "Perfect Illusion" dull.

The Guardians Caroline Sullivan considered Joanne a "brave move" for Gaga and rated it three-out-of-five-stars. She explained that "Gaga's huge voice adds a self-protective veneer, as does the presence of the other musicians, but at least she's done the groundwork for future albums that might show her with true transparency". Digital Spy's Lewis Corner wrote: "Joanne is clearly Gaga's most personal album, popping aside the synthetic personas for something more honest and, well, human. Mother Monster may be retired for now, but Lady Gaga's sheer musical brilliance still shines through." For Evan Sawdey of PopMatters, the album—with its "flaws and all"—was a correct musical step for Gaga, which he believed would make "fans and observers once again rethink what they know about the daring diva". Similarly, Amanda Petrusich of Pitchfork remarked how Gaga explored an alternative path musically, diverging from "visual provocations" that permeated most of her career.

Mikael Wood of the Los Angeles Times felt that most songs on the album "lacked strong stories" and were "mere stylistic exercises" on Gaga's part. Rich Juzwiak, who reviewed Joanne for Spin, did not find the musical evolution that Gaga presented on the album authentic. Rating the album two-out-of-four stars, journalist Greg Kot wrote in the Chicago Tribune that "[Gaga] sounds like she's just trying too hard" with Joanne. He also criticized the social commentary-filled lyrics on songs like "Come to Mama" and "Angel Down". Jon Caramanica of The New York Times noted the album's elemental sound did not come as a surprise and felt that it was not "daring or radical—it's logical, a rejoinder to her past and also to the candy-striped pop that surrounds her".

Commercial performance
In the United States, Joanne debuted at number one on the Billboard 200, moving 201,000 album-equivalent units of which 170,000 were pure sales, according to Nielsen SoundScan. It became Gaga's fourth album to top the chart following Born This Way (2011), Artpop (2013), and Cheek to Cheek (2014). It was 2016's second-highest debut for an album by a woman in the US after Beyoncé's Lemonade opened with 653,000 copies. As a result, Gaga became the first woman to have four US number one albums in the 2010s. The album-equivalent units for Joanne consisted of 135,000 song sales and 26 million streams along with 170,000 traditional album sales. Joannes debut helped Gaga rise to number one on the Billboard Artist 100, which measures artist activity across the publication's most influential charts. The album's sales dropped by 70% to 61,000 units in the second week, with it falling to number five on the Billboard 200. Following Gaga's Super Bowl halftime show performance, Joanne rose 66–2 on the Billboard 200, selling 48,000 copies and 74,000 album-equivalent units. It has sold 649,000 units as of February 2019 in the United States and was certified Platinum in October 2017 by the Recording Industry Association of America (RIAA) for selling over a million equivalent units in the country.

Joanne debuted at number two on the Canadian Albums Chart with 17,500 album-equivalent units, behind Leonard Cohen's You Want It Darker. According to the Canadian SoundScan, the album had the third-highest on-demand streams in the country. On November 4, 2016, the album was certified Gold by Music Canada for shipments of 40,000 copies in the country. Like in the United States, the Super Bowl performance also had an impact in Canada, where Joanne vaulted from 54–2 on the album chart, with a 524-percent gain in album-equivalent units.

In the United Kingdom, Joanne debuted at number three on the UK Albums Chart, with first-week sales of 26,694 copies, behind Elvis Presley's posthumous release, The Wonder of You, and Michael Bublé's Nobody but Me. On the UK Album Downloads Chart, Joanne entered the chart at number one. It also reached number two on the Official Albums Streaming Chart and number five on the Official Physical Albums Chart. The following week it dropped to number 14, with sales of 9,602 units. Following the Super Bowl performance, the record rose from number 88 to number 11 on the chart with sales increasing to 5,289 copies. As of June 2020, the album has sold 168,564 copies in the UK and has been certified Gold by the British Phonographic Industry (BPI). Joanne debuted at number three on the Irish Albums Chart. The album's debut failed to meet expectations in France, where it entered the album chart at number nine, with sales of just over 8,000 copies. Pure Charts website theorized that the moderate performance of the lead single, "Perfect Illusion", and the absence of Gaga in the media during the album's release week contributed to the album's low debut. By year end, they deemed Joanne one of the commercially disappointing albums in France, achieving total sales of only 12,000 copies. Two years after its release, the album racked up a Gold certification for selling 50,000 equivalent units there.

Joanne debuted at number two on both the Australian and New Zealand album charts. The Australian Recording Industry Association (ARIA) reported that Joanne was Gaga's second consecutive solo album to debut at number two on the chart following Artpop. In Japan, Joanne debuted at number 10 on the Oricon Albums Chart with first week sales of 8,026 copies. According to the International Federation of the Phonographic Industry (IFPI), Joanne was the 22nd best-selling album of 2016, selling one million copies that year.

Accolades and impact
Joanne was ranked in several publications' year-end lists. Billboard ranked it as the 32nd-best album of 2016, adding that the "kitchen-sink pop album" had an "instant-classic breakup ballad" in "Million Reasons", which enabled Gaga to reclaim "her sweet spot with Joanne". Digital Spys Lewis Corner placed the record at number nine, believing that "simplicity" was the key to the album's success. Joanne was NME magazine's 20th-best album of the year, with the publication highlighting how it hearkened back to the stripped-down sound employed by Gaga in her early years as an artist. For Rolling Stone, the album was the seventh-best pop release of 2016, with a writer from the magazine feeling that, "Gaga's soft-rock transformation takes the pop star into a new direction without losing her flair for the dramatic and penchant for the kitschy." The album was nominated for the Grammy Award for Best Pop Vocal Album at the 60th Annual Grammy Awards, while "Million Reasons" was nominated for Best Pop Solo Performance. "Million Reasons" was one of the award-winning songs at the BMI Awards. The piano version of the title track won Best Pop Solo Performance at the 61st Annual Grammy Awards.

While reviewing Kesha's third studio album, Rainbow (2017), Spencer Kornhaber of The Atlantic noted the use of analogue instruments in lieu of electric ones as had been done with the songs on Joanne. Kesha also tamed down her image like Gaga, but kept her distinct personality. In a Vanity Fair article, Josh Duboff wrote that singer Justin Timberlake's "countryfied" musical endeavors with his Man of the Woods (2018) album era recalled Joanne. Hugh McIntyre of Forbes found singer Harry Styles' debut single, "Sign of the Times" (2017), incorporated glam rock in its composition. Kornhaber and Billy Nilles from E! News identified Miley Cyrus's sixth studio album Younger Now (2017) and Kylie Minogue's fourteenth studio album Golden (2018) as part of a trend of pop singers going through a country phase, which they compared to Gaga's work on Joanne.

Brittany Spanos of Rolling Stone observed, Joanne served as singer Noah Cyrus's "muse" and songwriting for her music, incorporating the country-themes of Gaga's endeavor. Gary Trust, in an article for Billboard, titled "Is Lady Gaga Bringing Back 'The Vocalist Era'?", noted that with the release of "Million Reasons" Gaga had brought her vocal abilities to the forefront. He interviewed radio programmers who theorized that releasing the song was part of a bigger musical picture and believed that the musical scene was "entering a new era of traditional ballads and big vocals".

Track listing 

Notes
  signifies a co-producer

Personnel 
Credits adapted from the liner notes of Joanne.

Music 

 Lady Gaga – vocals (all tracks), piano (tracks 7, 9–11, 13–14), percussion (tracks 2–3), backing vocals (track 9)
 Mark Ronson – bass (tracks 1–4, 7, 9, 12–13), guitar (tracks 2–7, 9, 12–13), keyboards (tracks 3, 13), Mellotron strings (tracks 3, 11), electric piano (track 1), synthesizer (track 6)
 BloodPop – synthesizer (tracks 4–6, 8, 12), keyboards (tracks 3, 7, 11), organ (track 2), bass (track 6), drums (track 11)
 Emile Haynie – drums, additional synths (track 9)
 Kevin Parker – drums, guitar, synthesizer (track 6)
 RedOne – guitar (track 14)
 Josh Homme – guitar (tracks 1–2, 4, 6), drums (track 4), slide guitar (track 8)
 Jeff Bhasker – synthesizers (track 1)
 Hillary Lindsey – additional vocals (tracks 7, 12), guitar (track 7), background vocals (track 8)
 Kelsey Lu – cello (track 10)
 Josh Tillman – drums (track 1)
 Thomas Brenneck – guitars (tracks 2, 8, 10)
 Victor Axelrod – piano (track 8), synthesizer (track 10)
 Florence Welch – vocals (track 10)
 Jack Byrne – guitar (track 10)
 Brian Newman – trumpet (tracks 2, 13)
 Anthony Rossomando – guitar (track 12)
 J. Gastelum Cochemea – tenor saxophone (track 2)
 Dave Guy – trumpet (track 2)
 Este Haim – percussion (track 2)
 Matt Helders – drums (track 1)
 Ian Hendrickson-Smith – baritone saxophone (track 2)
 James King – baritone, tenor and alto saxes (track 9)
 Brent Kolatalo – drums (track 9)
 Steve Kortyka – saxophone (track 13)
 Don Lawrence – vocal instruction
 Sean Lennon – slide guitar (track 8)
 Ken Lewis – drums (track 9)
 Leon Michels – keyboards, Mellotron (track 8)
 Tom Moth – harp (track 10)
 Nicholas Movshon – bass (tracks 8, 10)
 Harper Simon – guitar (track 3)
 Homer Steinweiss – drums (tracks 8, 10, 13)

Production 

 Lady Gaga – production (all tracks)
 Mark Ronson – production (tracks 1–13)
 BloodPop – production (tracks 1–12), rhythm track (tracks 1–7, 12), rhythm programming (tracks 8, 10), string programming (track 7), synthesizer programming (track 9)
 Emile Haynie – production (track 9)
 Kevin Parker – production (track 6)
 RedOne – production, mixing, programming (track 14)
 Josh Homme – co-production (track 1)
 Jeff Bhasker – co-production (track 1)
 Ben Baptie – mixing (tracks 11, 13)
 Joshua Blair – recording (tracks 1–13)
 Brandon Bost – mixing assistance (tracks 1, 3–4, 7–10, 12), recording (track 7)
 Johnnie Burik – recording assistance (track 3)
 Christopher Cerullo – recording assistance (track 10)
 Chris Claypool – recording assistance (track 10)
 David "Squirrel" Covell – recording assistance (tracks 1–10, 12), recording (track 11)
 Tom Coyne – mastering (all tracks)
 Matthew Cullen – recording (track 8)
 Riccardo Damian – recording (tracks 1, 13)
 Abby Echiverri – recording assistance (track 8)
 Tom Elmhirst – mixing (tracks 1, 3–4, 7–10, 12)
 Serban Ghenea – mixing (tracks 2, 5–6)
 John Hanes – mix engineering (tracks 2, 5–6)
 Michael Harris – recording assistance (track 10)
 T.I. Jakke – mixing (track 14)
 Jens Jungkerth – recording (tracks 8, 10)
 Brent Kolatalo – recording (track 9)
 Ken Lewis – recording (track 9)
 Barry McCready – recording assistance (tracks 2, 4–7, 9, 11–13), recording (track 13)
 Ed McEntee – recording assistance (track 8)
 Randy Merrill – mastering (all tracks)
 Trevor Muzzy – recording (track 14)
 Charley Pollard – recording assistance (track 4)
 Benjamin Rice – recording (tracks 2, 12)
 Dave Russell – recording (track 3)
 Brett "123" Shaw – recording (track 10)
 Justin Smith – recording (tracks 1, 3, 8), recording assistance (tracks 2, 4, 6, 11)
 Joe Visciano – mixing assistance (tracks 1, 3–4, 7–10, 12), recording (track 7)
 Alekes Von Korff – recording (track 14)

Management 

 Lady Gaga – executive production, creative direction, photography
 Mark Ronson – executive production
 Bobby Campbell – management
 John Janick – A&R
 Andrea Gelardin – creative direction, photography
 Ruth Hogben – creative direction, photography
 Brandon Maxwell – creative direction, fashion direction
 Florence Welch – photography
 Collier Schorr – photography
 Sandra Amador – styling
 Frederic Aspiras – hair
 Sarah Tanno – makeup
 An Yen – graphic design
 Brian Roettinger – graphic design
 Lisa Einhorn-Gilder – production coordination
 Ashley Gutierrez – assistance to Lady Gaga

Charts

Weekly charts

Year-end charts

Certifications and sales

See also 
 List of Billboard 200 number-one albums of 2016
 List of Gaon Album Chart number ones of 2016
 List of number-one albums of 2016 (Mexico)
 List of Oricon number-one albums of 2016
 List of UK Album Downloads Chart number ones of the 2010s

References

External links 
 

2016 albums
Albums produced by Josh Homme
Albums produced by Kevin Parker
Albums produced by Mark Ronson
Albums produced by RedOne
Interscope Records albums
Lady Gaga albums
Soft rock albums by American artists
Albums produced by Lady Gaga
Albums recorded at Shangri-La (recording studio)
Albums recorded at Electro-Vox Recording Studios
Albums recorded at Electric Lady Studios
Americana albums